Moritz Szeps (5 November 1835, Busk – 9 August 1902, Vienna) was an Austrian  newspaper tycoon who founded and published the Neues Wiener Tagblatt (1867-1886), Wiener Tagblatt (1886-1894), and Das Wissen für Alle (1900).

Early life 
Szeps was born into a Jewish family in Busk, Ukraine in 1835. His father was a doctor, and he initially studied medicine in Lemberg. After going to Vienna to continue his studies, he decided to change careers and became a journalist instead.

Journalism and publishing 
In 1867, following the resignation of most of its employees, he took over the Neues Wiener Tagblatt, which became the leading  a liberal newspaper in Austria. As a friend of Crown Prince Rudolf, Szeps published his political writings anonymously. Szeps, however, was not shy about making direct attacks on his opponents and critics. By 1876, he was sufficiently successful to build his own home, the "Palais Szeps", which is now the residence of the Swedish Ambassador. 

Eventually, his financial backers wanted him to be more cautious and, in 1886, eased him out of the company. With the help of a Hungarian financier, he purchased the Morgen-Post and changed its name to the Wiener Tagblatt (after 1901, Wiener Morgenzeitung). The paper eventually failed to meet expectations, and was discontinued in 1905.

Like the Crown Prince, he felt that Austria should emulate France, rather than reactionary Prussia. Therefore, he had numerous contacts in Paris, including Georges Clemenceau, who was also a newspaper editor at  that time. This was met with fierce opposition by the Pro-German nationalists, who were increasingly Anti-Semitic. When the Crown Prince died in 1889, the liberal cause suffered a serious setback and Szeps's finances dwindled accordingly.

Legacy 
Szeps' daughter, Berta Zuckerkandl, became a well known writer, journalist and art critic. Berta and her husband Emil Zuckerhandl created a brilliant salon for artists and writers that was at the center of cultural life. His other daughter, Sophie, married Paul Clemenceau, the brother of the prime minister of France.

References

Further reading 
 
 Nathalie Beer: Das Leben und Wirken des Journalisten Moriz Szeps (1834–1902). Masterarbeit Universität Wien – Historisch-Kulturwissenschaftliche Fakultät, Wien 2013 (Online)
 Kurt Paupié: Moritz Szeps. Persönlichkeit, Werk und Beziehungen zum Kaiserhaus. Dissertation, University of Vienna, 1949
 Lucian O. Meysels: In meinem Salon ist Österreich. Berta Zuckerkandl und ihre Zeit. Herold, Wien/München 1984, Edition INW, Illustrierte Neue Welt, Vienna, 1997,

External links 

 "Moritz Szeps" at the Wien Geschichte Wiki
 

1835 births
1902 deaths
People from Busk, Ukraine
Ukrainian Jews
Jews from Galicia (Eastern Europe)
Austrian journalists
Austrian Jews
Austrian publishers (people)